13003 Dickbeasley, provisional designation , is a background asteroid from the central region of the asteroid belt, approximately 6 kilometers in diameter. It was discovered by American astronomer Edward Bowell at Lowell's Anderson Mesa Station on 21 March 1982. The asteroid was named in memory of American NAU administrator Dick Beasley.

Orbit and classification 

Dickbeasley is a non-family asteroid from the main belt's background population. It orbits the Sun in the central main-belt at a distance of 2.0–3.1 AU once every 4 years and 1 month (1,495 days). Its orbit has an eccentricity of 0.21 and an inclination of 27° with respect to the ecliptic. The body's observation arc begins with its official discovery observation, as no precoveries were taken, and no prior identifications were made.

Naming 

This minor planet was named in memory of American Richard "Dick" E. Beasley (1934–1992), a teacher and administrator at Northern Arizona University. He was also a multi-media artist and a preeminent figure in the calligraphic world. The approved naming citation was published by the Minor Planet Center on 9 February 2009.

Physical characteristics

Rotation period 

In April 2015, a rotational lightcurve of Dickbeasley was obtained from photometric observations made at the Phillips Academy Observatory . It gave a rotation period of  hours with a brightness variation of 0.44 magnitude. One month later, in May 2015, observations at Texas Tech's Preston Gott Observatory gave a concurring period of  hours with an amplitude of 0.30 magnitude.

These results supersede the first obtained lightcurve at the Palomar Transient Factory from September 2012, which gave a period of  hours and an amplitude of 0.42.

Diameter and albedo 

According to the surveys carried out by the NEOWISE mission of NASA's space-based Wide-field Infrared Survey Explorer, Dickbeasley measures 8.2 kilometers in diameter and its surface has an albedo of 0.07, while he Collaborative Asteroid Lightcurve Link assumes a standard albedo for stony asteroids of 0.20 and calculates a diameter of 5.4 kilometers with an absolute magnitude of 13.7.

References

External links 
 Richard E. Beasley, Biography
 Richard E. Beasley (1934–1992), The Art of the Letter
 Asteroid Lightcurve Database (LCDB), query form (info )
 Dictionary of Minor Planet Names, Google books
 Asteroids and comets rotation curves, CdR – Observatoire de Genève, Raoul Behrend
 Discovery Circumstances: Numbered Minor Planets (10001)-(15000) – Minor Planet Center
 
 

013003
Discoveries by Edward L. G. Bowell
Named minor planets
19820321